Gandhi Sangrahalaya is the name of several museums in India, most of them named after Mahatma Gandhi. It may refer to:

 Gandhi Sangrahalaya, Patna
 Gandhi Smarak Sangrahalaya, Ahmedabad
 National Gandhi Museum, New Delhi
 Gandhi Memorial Museum, Madurai
 Eternal Gandhi Multimedia Museum
 Indira Gandhi Rashtriya Manav Sangrahalaya
 Kaba Gandhi No Delo, Rajkot